2001 Continental Championships may refer to:

African Championships
 Basketball: 2001 FIBA Africa Championship

Asian Championships
 Baseball: 2001 Asian Baseball Championship
 Basketball: 2001 ABC Championship
 Football (soccer): 2000–01 Asian Club Championship

European Championships
 Artistic gymnastics: 2001 European Team Gymnastics Championships
 Athletics: 2001 IAAF World Indoor Championships
 Basketball: EuroBasket 2001
 Figure skating: 2001 European Figure Skating Championships
 Football (soccer): 2000–01 UEFA Champions League
 Football (soccer): 2000–01 UEFA Cup
 Football (soccer): 2001 UEFA European Under-16 Championship
 Football (soccer): 2001–02 UEFA Women's Cup 
 Volleyball: 2001–02 CEV Champions League
 Volleyball: 2001–02 CEV Women's Champions League

Oceanian Championships
 Basketball: 2001 FIBA Oceania Championship

Pan American Championships / North American Championships
 Basketball: 2001 Tournament of the Americas
 Football (soccer): 2001 Caribbean Cup
 Gymnastics (artistic and rhythmic): 2001 Pan American Gymnastics Championships

South American Championships
 Football (soccer): 2001 Copa Libertadores

See also
 2001 World Championships (disambiguation)
 2001 World Junior Championships (disambiguation)
 2001 World Cup (disambiguation)
 Continental championship (disambiguation)

Continental championships